Sell Me a God is the 1989 debut album by the British alternative rock band Eat. Prior to the album's release, the band members had all been homeless, with a few of them squatting at London King's Cross railway station.

Production
The music on Sell Me a God encompasses a variety of styles, including blues, hip hop and funk

Release and reception
The album reached #10 on the UK Indie Chart. The album failed to gain much popularity outside of the UK. Doug Brod, writing for Trouser Press, described the album as a "most impressive debut", writing that the diverse influences on the album "created an instantly familiar record that ultimately sounds like no one else". According to Ira Robbins, also from Trouser Press, it was "grossly underappreciated". David Toop, writing for The Times described it as an "impressive" debut.

Sell Me a God was released on CD, MC and vinyl, with the CD and MC release adding three bonus tracks, including a cover of "Summer in the City" by The Lovin' Spoonful.

Track listing
All tracks composed by Eat
 "Tombstone" – 2:53
 "Electric City" – 4:02
 "Fatman" – 4:50
 "Stories" – 2:42
 "Walking Man" – 3:51
 "Skin" – 4:43
 "Red Moon" – 5:49 (bonus track on CD and MC release)
 "Insect Head" – 5:24
 "Body Bag" – 5:04
 "Things I Need" – 4:14
 "Judgement Train" – 4:12
 "Gyrate" – 6:06 (bonus track on CD and MC release)
 "Summer in the City" – 3:30 (bonus track on CD and MC release)
 "Mr & Mrs Smack" – 5:03

Personnel
 Tim Sewell – bass guitar, synthesizer, backing vocals
 Pete Howard – drums, percussion
 Max Noble – guitar, percussion
 Paul Noble – guitar, percussion, backing vocals
 Ange Dolittle – vocals, harmonica

References
The Aural Dustbin review

Allmusic album review

1989 debut albums
Eat (band) albums
Fiction Records albums